John Hartley Manners (10 August 1870 – 19 December 1928) was a London-born playwright of Irish extraction who wrote Peg o' My Heart, which starred his wife, Laurette Taylor, on Broadway in one of her greatest stage triumphs.

Biography
He was born on 10 August 1870. He wrote the 1922 silent screen adaptation of his own 1912 play Peg o' My Heart which starred Laurette. The 1933 sound remake starring Marion Davies was adapted from Manners' play as Manners had died in 1928. Manners also wrote two 1924 silent film screenplays which starred his wife in her only two other motion picture appearances, Happiness adapted from his play, and One Night in Rome. The latter his wife particularly enjoyed and kept a personal print to run over and over for guests.

His one-act radio play The Queen's Messenger was adapted to become the first ever broadcast television drama only three months before his death on 19 December 1928.

Productions

Peg o' My Heart, a comedy, played in New York City from December 20, 1912 to May 30, 1914. It afterward had a long run in London. The play was the subject of a United States Supreme Court case decided in 1920, Manners v. Morosco.

Manners' other plays include:
 As Once in May
 The Crossways, in collaboration with Lillie Langtry
 The Day of Dupes
 Ganton & Co.
 Getting Together
 The Girl and the Wizard
 The Girl in Waiting
 The Great John Ganton
 Happiness
 The Harp of Life
 The House Next Door
 The Indiscretion of Truth
 The Lancers
 The Majesty of Birth
 A Marriage of Reason
 The National Anthem
 One Night in Rome
 Out There
 The Patriot
 The Prince of Bohemia
 The Queen's Messenger
 A Woman Intervenes
 The Wooing of Eve
 Zira, with Henry Miller
He published Peg o' My Heart in 1913, and Happiness and Other Plays, including Just as Well and The Day of Dupes in 1914.

He died of esophageal cancer in New York City, aged 58.

References

External links

 
 

J. Hartley Manners on Great War Theatre

1870 births
1928 deaths
20th-century British dramatists and playwrights
British dramatists and playwrights
British people of Irish descent
Deaths from cancer in New York (state)
Deaths from esophageal cancer
English emigrants to the United States
British male dramatists and playwrights
Writers from London